Shag Rocks may refer to:

 Shag Rocks (Massachusetts)
 Shag Rocks, South Georgia
 Shag Rocks (Western Australia), rocks in Western Australia

See also
 Shag Reef
 Shag Rock (disambiguation)